The Soviet Union's 1954 nuclear test series was a group of 10 nuclear tests conducted in 1954. These tests followed the 1953 Soviet nuclear tests series and preceded the 1955 Soviet nuclear tests series.

References

1954
1954 in the Soviet Union
1954 in military history
Explosions in 1954
September 1954 events in Asia
October 1954 events in Asia